Leo Richard Hamilton (December 13, 1927 – December 26, 2010) was a member of the Wisconsin State Assembly.

Biography
Hamilton was born on December 13, 1927, in Saint Paul, Minnesota. He graduated from St. Thomas Military Academy and the University of Notre Dame. During the Korean War, he served in the United States Army.

On March 3, 1951, Hamilton married Irene Fliehr in Chippewa Falls, Wisconsin. They had four children. Hamilton died on December 26, 2010.

Political career
Hamilton was mayor of Chippewa Falls from 1981 to 1987. In 1986, he was elected to the Assembly and served three terms. He was a Democrat.

References

External links

1927 births
2010 deaths
Politicians from Saint Paul, Minnesota
Politicians from Chippewa Falls, Wisconsin
Democratic Party members of the Wisconsin State Assembly
Mayors of places in Wisconsin
Military personnel from Wisconsin
United States Army soldiers
United States Army personnel of the Korean War
University of Notre Dame alumni